Irregular bleeding may refer to:
 Irregular menstruation
 Oligomenorrhea
 Metrorrhagia
 Breakthrough bleeding, usually referring to mid-cycle uterine bleeding in users of combined oral contraceptives